Olive Heights is the most densely populated neighborhood in Pasadena, California.It is bordered by Mountain Street to the north, Walnut Street to the south, El Molino Avenue to the west, and Lake Avenue to the east.

Education
Olive Heights is served by Madison, Jefferson, and McKinley Elementary Schools; Washington, Eliot, and McKinley Middle Schools; Muir High School and Pasadena High School

Transportation
The Metro L Line has a stop on Lake Avenue at Interstate 210. Olive Heights is also served by Metro Local line 662 and Pasadena Transit route 40.

Government
Olive Heights is part of City Council District 3, represented by John J Kennedy, and District 5, represented by Jessica Rivas.

References

Neighborhoods in Pasadena, California